Wowowin is a Philippine television variety show broadcast by All TV. Hosted by Willie Revillame, it premiered on May 10, 2015 on GMA Network. The show aired its final broadcast on GMA Network on February 11, 2022. The show premiered on All TV on September 13, 2022.

Overview
 
Originally produced by Willie Revillame's WBR Entertainment Productions Inc., it served as a blocktimer on GMA Network. Randy Santiago originally served as the show's director. The show's theme song was composed by Lito Camo and arranged by Albert Tamayo. In late 2015, the show became a co-production between GMA Entertainment Group and WBR Entertainment Productions Inc. On February 1, 2016, the show joined the network's Telebabad line up.

In June 2017, co-host Super Tekla was fired from the show. On September 30, 2019, Sugar Mercado and Donita Nose returned to the show.
The show's Saturday edition, Wowowin Primetime premiered on February 15, 2020, on the network's Sabado Star Power sa Gabi line up replacing Daddy's Gurl. Gab Valenciano, who was hired in January 2020 served as the director. In March 2020, the admission of a live audience in the studio and production were suspended due to the enhanced community quarantine in Luzon caused by the COVID-19 pandemic. The show resumed its programming on April 13, 2020.

The show aired on GMA Network for the last time on February 11, 2022, as Revillame's contract with the network ended in the same month.

The show resumed through livestreaming on YouTube and Facebook on March 15, 2022. On July 15, 2022, it was announced that the show would return on All TV on September 13, after Revillame signed a contract with AMBS. After its broadcast in All TV received low ratings, online livestreaming was ceased on September 26, 2022, to encourage the viewers to watch it on All TV.

Cast

 Willie Revillame 

Former hosts
 Yvette Corral 
 Janelle "Kim Chi" Tee 
 Donita Nose 
 Jennifer "DJ JL" Lee 
 Super Tekla 
 Amal Rosaroso 
 Ashley Ortega 
 Ariella Arida 
 Sugar Mercado 
 Camille Canlas 
 Jannie Alipo-on 
 Patricia Tumulak 
 Nelda Ibe 
 Kim Idol 
 Petite 
 Le Chazz 
 Halimatu Yushawu 
 Elaine Timbol 
 Almira Teng 
 Valerie Concepcion 
 Boobsie Wonderland 
 Herlene Budol 

Dancers
 Karen Ortua 
 April "Congratulations" Gustillo 
 Joyce Burgos 
 Samantha Flores 
 Yvette Corral 
 Monique "Pak" Natada 
 Chiastine Faye Perez 
 Bea Marie Holmes 
 Samantha Page 
 Lalaine Haddad 
 Karen Vicente 
 Ley Lopez 
 Honey Nicerio 
 Sharlyn Dizon 
 Zandra Faye Gonzalez 
 Patricia Reyes 
 Jho Ann Sotelo 
 Kristine Joy Paras 
 Kay Shivaun 
 Mabelle Rico 
 Princess "Upnek" Lerio 
 Clarisse Mae Chua 
 Ynna Marie Bayot 
 Tezza Santos 
 Burn Sanchez 
 Jules Cruz 
 Janine “Shin” Pasciolco 
 Geneva "Baby Gene" Reyes 
 Glory Mae Camu 
 Ann Duque 
 Kathleen "Cookie" Bueno 
 Lyca Makino 
 Grace Buenconsejo 
 Nikkie Millares 
 Jovie "Baby Girl" Bautista 
 Mabelle Portez 
 Angel Gavilan 
 Jannah Dazo 
 Fey Dela Peña 
 Princess Gregorio 
 Yannah Hernandez 
 Yam Masangkay 
 Sandy "Liwayway" Tolentino 
 Joy Basa 
 Mae Bejar 
 Lana Palting (2019)
 Kayeann Picache 
 Melanie Grace Umali 
 Yhanna Whiwit 
 Jaye Anne Balangue 
 Alex Manla 
 Chinkee "Chinkeenini" Brice 
 Lhia "Ligaya" De Guzman 
 Aika Hernandez 
 Jhovielyn "Jovy" Bernal 
 Ayrra Averilla 
 Sheryl "Love Yah" Moñeno 
 Precious Quirino 
 Jonalyn Flores 
 Jeraldine "Lawin" Faustino 
 Erica "The Mabalaquena" Macapagal

Controversies
In January 2019, one person from the audience died on the set of Wowowin, and one person was injured due to an accident. On July 24, 2019, host Willie Revillame disqualified a group of contestants for modus operandi.

Ratings
According to AGB Nielsen Philippines' Mega Manila household television ratings, the pilot episode of Wowowin earned a 22.1% rating. While the premiere episode of Wowowin Primetime scored an 11.5% rating, according to AGB Nielsen Philippines' Nationwide Urban Television Audience Measurement People in television homes.

Based on Nielsen Philippines' National Urban TV Audience Measurement people data, the premiere of Wowowin on All TV scored a 0% rating.

Accolades

References

External links
 

2015 Philippine television series debuts
Filipino-language television shows
All TV (Philippines) original programming
GMA Network original programming
Philippine variety television shows
Television productions suspended due to the COVID-19 pandemic
Willie Revillame